Chris Tse (born 1982) is a New Zealand poet, short story writer and editor. His works explore questions of identity, including his Chinese heritage and queer identity. His first full-length poetry collection, How to be Dead in a Year of Snakes, won the Jessie Mackay Award for Best First Book of Poetry at the Ockham New Zealand Book Awards in 2016. He has been appointed as the New Zealand Poet Laureate from 2022 to 2024.

Background 
Tse was born in 1982 in Lower Hutt, New Zealand. He is of Chinese heritage, which is the subject of much of his work. He began writing poetry as a teenager.  He studied film and English literature at Victoria University of Wellington, where he also completed a Master of Arts degree in creative writing from the International Institute of Modern Letters.

Tse lives and works in Wellington.

Works 
The major themes of Tse's writing include identity, his Chinese heritage and the experiences of Chinese immigrants to New Zealand in the twentieth century. In 2009 he won an award for his short story, "At Two Speeds", in a competition held by the New Zealand Listener and the New Zealand Chinese Association.

Tse's first appearance in a major publication was the joint collection AUP New Poets 4 (with Harry Jones and Erin Scudder), published by Auckland University Press in 2011). Tse's section in the book, "Sing Joe", recounts his great-grandfather's immigration to New Zealand at the turn of the twentieth century, as well as Tse's own return to China as an adult.

In 2014, Auckland University Press published Tse's first full-length collection, How to be Dead in a Year of Snakes. The collection is a book-length sequence that revisits the 1905 murder of Joe Kum Yung at the hands of the racist Lionel Terry. How to be Dead in a Year of Snakes was a finalist in the poetry category at the 2016 Ockham New Zealand Book Awards, where it won the Jessie Mackay Award for Best First Book of Poetry.

Tse's second collection, He's So MASC, was published by Auckland University Press in March 2018. The collection explores themes of identity, sexuality and pop culture.

In November 2021, Auckland University Press published Out Here: An Anthology of Takatapui and LGBTQIA+ writers from Aotearoa, edited by Tse and poet Emma Barnes. The anthology is the first major anthology of queer writing published in New Zealand, featuring 69 writers from across the rainbow spectrum.

In 2022, Auckland University Press published Tse's third collection, Super Model Minority. The collection expands on themes from his previous collections and has been described as the final part in 'a loose trilogy'.

Poet Laureate 
In August 2022, the National Library of New Zealand named Chris Tse as the next New Zealand Poet Laureate. Tse told Stuff News that the work of previous poet laureates had meant "so much" to him as a young poet, and that he wanted to use his platform to move poetry into the mainstream more.

Awards 
 New Zealand Listener / New Zealand Chinese Association Short Story Prize (2009) for "At Two Speeds"
 How to Be Dead in a Year of Snakes, Jessie Mackay Award for Best First Book of Poetry at the 2016 Ockham New Zealand Book Awards

References 

21st-century New Zealand writers
21st-century New Zealand male writers
Living people
1982 births
International Institute of Modern Letters alumni
New Zealand male poets
People from Lower Hutt
New Zealand people of Chinese descent
People from Wellington City
New Zealand LGBT poets
21st-century New Zealand LGBT people
New Zealand Poets Laureate